Aldo Trivella (1 April 1921 – 2 June 1978) was an Italian ski jumper. He competed in the individual event at the 1948 Winter Olympics.

References

External links
 

1921 births
1978 deaths
Italian male ski jumpers
Olympic ski jumpers of Italy
Ski jumpers at the 1948 Winter Olympics